John Drennan Eggar (1 December 1916 – 3 May 1983) was an English schoolmaster and first-class cricketer who played for Oxford University and Hampshire in 1938 and for Derbyshire from 1946 to 1954.

Eggar was born in Nowshera, British India, the son of John Norman Eggar and his wife Emily Garret. He was educated in England at Winchester College and then went to Brasenose College, Oxford. He played cricket for Oxford University holding a stand in the drawn University match in 1938. He also played for Hampshire during the 1938 season. During the Second World War he served in the Rifle Brigade.

After the war, Eggar became a master at Repton School and played for Derbyshire. Eggar with Guy Willatt, and Dick Sale formed a trio of Repton masters who played for the county. In the 1947 season he shared a record-breaking partnership of 349 with Charlie Elliott in the year when Derbyshire finished 5th. In the 1949 season he scored 218 in a match against Yorkshire. Eggar played regularly until the 1950 season when Derbyshire were fifth. He had a break until the 1954 season when he played two games and Derbyshire finished in third place in the County Championship. He held a testimonial match at Repton that summer. Two years later he played in a 2nd XI match for Derbyshire.  He was a right-handed batsman and played 64 innings in 41 first-class matches. His top score was 219 and his average 31.84. He was a right-arm medium-pace bowler but took only one wicket.

In 1963 Eggar became headmaster of newly established Shiplake College. Under his headmastership, numbers went from 100 to 300. He retired in 1979 and died on a tennis court at Hinton St George, Somerset four years later.

Eggar's father-in-law was John Crommelin-Brown, another Repton master who played cricket for Derbyshire during the 1920s. His son Tim Eggar became a Member of Parliament.

References

1916 births
1983 deaths
People educated at Winchester College
Alumni of Brasenose College, Oxford
Derbyshire cricketers
Hampshire cricketers
Oxford University cricketers
English cricketers
Rifle Brigade officers
British Army personnel of World War II
Military personnel of British India